Justice Watts may refer to:

Joseph M. Watt, associate justice of the Oklahoma Supreme Court
Richard C. Watts, associate justice of the South Carolina Supreme Court
Shirley M. Watts, judge of the Maryland Court of Appeals